Argus is an unincorporated community in Bucks County, Pennsylvania, United States. It operated a United States Post Office until 1953.

Geography
Pennsylvania State Game Lands Number 196 is located just to the east.

References

Sources
 Fretz, A Henry. 1953. Bucks County Place Names. 
 Pennsylvania Department of Internal Affairs. Monthly Bulletin 21:2 p. 7-15, 29-32 
 Pennsylvania Department of Internal Affairs. Monthly Bulletin 21:3 p. 18-24, 29-32 
 Pennsylvania Department of Internal Affairs. Monthly Bulletin 21:4 p. 23-32 
 Pennsylvania Department of Internal Affairs. Monthly Bulletin 21:5 p. 26-31 
 Pennsylvania Department of Internal Affairs. Monthly Bulletin 41:6 31-32

Unincorporated communities in Bucks County, Pennsylvania
Unincorporated communities in Pennsylvania